Francesco Maria Abbiati, C.R.L. (died 5 August 1650) was a Roman Catholic prelate who served as Bishop of Bobbio (1618–1650).

Biography
Francesco Maria Abbiati was ordained a priest in the Canons Regular of the Lateran.
On 3 December 1618, he was appointed during the papacy of Pope Paul V as Bishop of Bobbio.
On 21 December 1618, he was consecrated bishop by Giovanni Garzia Mellini, Cardinal-Priest of Santi Quattro Coronati. 
He served as Bishop of Bobbio until his death on 5 August 1650.

While bishop, he was the principal co-consecrator of Ippolito Campioni, Bishop of Chiusi (1638); and Francesco Antonio Biondo, Bishop of Capri (1638).

References

External links and additional sources
 (for Chronology of Bishops) 
 (for Chronology of Bishops)  

Date of birth missing
1650 deaths
17th-century Italian Roman Catholic bishops
Bishops appointed by Pope Paul V
Canons Regular of the Lateran